Filipina singer and songwriter Clara Benin has released one studio album, three extended play (EPs), seventeen singles and five music videos.

Albums

Studio albums

Extended plays

Singles

Covers

Other appearances

References

External links
 Official website
 

Discographies of Filipino artists
Pop music discographies